The Transnistrian Ukrainian dialect, Opil dialect or Galician dialect is a dialect of Ukrainian spoken in the western part of Ukraine and in the Moldovan breakaway region of Transnistria. According to Transnistria's constitution, the three official languages of Transnistria are Ukrainian together with Romanian (officially named Moldovan) and Russian.

The Transnistrian Ukrainian dialect is typically grouped together with other southwestern dialects of Ukrainian.

Lexical differences between Transnistrian Ukrainian and standard Ukrainian:

References 

Ukrainian dialects
Languages of Transnistria